The 36th New Brunswick Legislative Assembly represented New Brunswick between March 26, 1926, and May 26, 1930.

William Frederick Todd served as Lieutenant-Governor of New Brunswick in 1926. He was succeeded by Hugh Havelock McLean in December 1928.

Joseph L. O'Brien was chosen as speaker.

The Conservative Party led by John Babington Macaulay Baxter defeated the Liberals to form the government.

History

Members 

Notes:

References 
 Canadian Parliamentary Guide, 1929, AL Normandin

Terms of the New Brunswick Legislature
1925 establishments in New Brunswick
1930 disestablishments in New Brunswick
20th century in New Brunswick